Sree Chaitanya College is a college in Habra in the state of West Bengal. It offers Undergraduate and Post Gradduate courses arts and sciences. It is affiliated to West Bengal State University.

History
The college was established in 1956, for providing higher education to local students. Habra Siksha Parishad took initiative with the help of the then Chief Minister, late Dr. Bidhan Chandra Roy for the purpose. This project was given a proper shape by the Minister in the D.r Roy's Cabinet, Mr. Tarun Kanti Ghosh, who was also an MLA from Habra. The College began its journey in the premises of Habra High School. thereafter shifted to site of Bangiya Christian Council and finally to its present premises on 5 October 1958. Presently the Sree Chaitanya College is situated in more than 20 acres of land beside the Jessore Road which is about 46 km from Kolkata.
Kalyan Niyogi stood 3rd in Pre-University Examination in 1961. He is the first person to receive a position in the Calcutta University examination.

Departments

Science

Chemistry
Physics
Mathematics 
Botany
Anthropology
Economics
Zoology

Arts

Bengali
English 
Sanskrit
History
Geography
Political Science
Philosophy
Journalism and Mass Communication
Defence Study

Accreditation
Sree Chaitanya College is recognized by the University Grants Commission (UGC). Recently, it has been re-accredited and awarded B++ grade by the National Assessment and Accreditation Council (NAAC).

See also
Education in India
List of colleges in West Bengal
Education in West Bengal

References

External links
Sree Chaitanya College

Universities and colleges in North 24 Parganas district
Colleges affiliated to West Bengal State University
Educational institutions established in 1956
1956 establishments in West Bengal